Barry Gordon Livingston (born December 17, 1953) is an American television and film actor, known for his role as Ernie Douglas on the television series My Three Sons (1963–72). He is the younger brother of actor/director Stanley Livingston, who played Ernie's older brother "Chip" on the show.

Life and career

Livingston was born in Los Angeles, California, the son of Lillian Rochelle Palyash and Hilliard Livingston.

He began his career as a child actor in the late 1950s. He considers his film debut a role he won as one of the sons of Paul Newman in the film Rally 'Round the Flag, Boys! (1958) with his older brother Stanley who, by this time, was already working as a child actor. He was let go from the film when he was told that he needed to get glasses to successfully correct his astigmatism. His first professional onscreen appearance was in a small, uncredited role in the 1961 film The Errand Boy, followed by roles as Barry, a neighborhood kid, in The Adventures of Ozzie & Harriet; on The Dick Van Dyke Show; and as "Arnold Mooney", son of banker Theodore J. Mooney portrayed by Gale Gordon, on The Lucy Show. In 1962, he appeared as one of the six children adopted by Debbie Reynolds in the film My Six Loves. In 1963, he joined the cast of the ABC sitcom My Three Sons as next door neighbor Ernie Thompson.

His older brother, Stanley Livingston, was already a series regular as Chip Douglas. After Tim Considine left the series two years later, Livingston joined the cast permanently (his character was adopted into the family, keeping the show's title intact) and remained with the series until its end in 1972. In 1964, at the age of ten, he appeared in the ABC medical drama about psychiatry, Breaking Point in the episode titled "A Land More Cruel".

After My Three Sons ended in 1972, Livingston landed roles in Room 222 and The Streets of San Francisco. He appeared on the stage as Linus in You're a Good Man Charlie Brown, which he reprised when the musical was adapted for television in 1973. Throughout the 1970s and 1980s, he continued to work steadily in films, made-for-TV movies and episodic television including Police Woman, Sidewinder 1, Simon & Simon, and 1st & Ten. He also appeared throughout the country in stage plays, including Broadway and off-Broadway. In 1974 he appeared in Sons and Daughters, a short-lived CBS series.

In 2007, he appeared in Zodiac. He had a major role in the Hallmark Channel movie Final Approach. He has also appeared in You Don't Mess with the Zohan (2008), The Social Network (2010), Horrible Bosses (2011), and War Dogs (2016).

In October 2011, Barry Livingston released his anecdote-filled autobiography, The Importance of Being Ernie -- detailing his career from My Three Sons to Mad Men and beyond.  He most recently appeared on television in episodes of Mad Men, The New Adventures of Old Christine, Two and a Half Men, and Anger Management. Barry Livingston is the only cast member of My Three Sons to still have an active Screen Actors Guild Card.

Personal life
Livingston married Karen Huntsman in 1983.

Select filmography

Film
 My Six Loves (1962) Sherman Smith
 Peege (1972) Damion
 Sidewinder 1 (1977) Willie Holt
 Masters of the Universe (1987) Charlie
 Easy Wheels (1989) Reporter
 The Nutt House (1992) Williams
 Maniac Cop III: Badge of Silence (1993) Asst. Coroner
 Invisible Mom (1997) Professor Karl Griffin
 Little Man on Campus (2000) Barry
 Tremors 3: Back to Perfection (2001) Dr. Andrew Merliss
 First Daughter (2004) Press Secretary
 Zodiac (2007) Copy Editor#3
 You Don't Mess with the Zohan (2008) Gray Kleibolt
 Porky's Pimpin' Pee Wee (2009) Uncle Howard
 The Social Network (2010) Mr. Cox
 Hostel: Part III (2011) Doctor
 Argo (2012) David Marmor, CIA official
 Jersey Boys (2014) Accountant
 War Dogs (2016) Army Bureaucrat

Television
 The Dick Van Dyke Show (1 episode, 1962)
 The Adventures of Ozzie & Harriet (8 episodes as "Barry", 1960–62)
 Sam Benedict (1 episode, 1963)
 Breaking Point (1 episode, 1964)
 The Lucy Show (2 episodes as "Arnold Mooney", 1963–64)
 Vacation Playhouse (1 episode, 1966)
 Dragnet (1967 TV series) (1 episode as "Horace Thornton", credited as "Michael Tanner", 1969)
 Marcus Welby, M.D. (1 episode as "Bobby", credited as "Michael Tanner", 1969)
 My Three Sons (recurring roles Ernie Thompson/Douglas,  (1963–72)
 Room 222 (1 episode, 1973)
 Ironside (1 episode, 1973)
 You're a Good Man, Charlie Brown (1973)
 Thicker Than Water (1 episode, 1973)
 The Streets of San Francisco (1 episode, 1973)
 The Elevator (1974)
 Sons and Daughters (unknown number of episodes, 1974)
 Police Woman (1 episode, 1974)
 Lucas Tanner (1 episode, 1975)
 High School U.S.A. (1983)
 Simon & Simon (1 episode, 1984)
 Hart to Hart (1 episode, 1984)
 1st & Ten (1 episode, 1985)
 Doogie Howser, M.D. (2 episodes, 1990–92)
 Lois & Clark: The New Adventures of Superman (3 episodes, 1994–95)
 Boston Common (1 episode, 1996)
 The Nanny (1 episode, 1997)
 Sliders (1 episode, 1997)
 Ally McBeal (1 episode, 1998)
 USA High (1 episode, 1998)
 Beyond Belief: Fact or Fiction (1 episode, 1998)
 Soldier of Fortune, Inc. (1 episode, 1999)
 The Hughleys (1 episode, 1999)
 Judging Amy (1 episode, 2000)
 Zoe, Duncan, Jack and Jane (1 episode, 2000)
 The Huntress (1 episode, 2000)
 Sabrina, the Teenage Witch (1 episode, 2000)
 Boston Public (1 episode, 2001)
 The West Wing (1 episode, 2001)
 All About Us (1 episode, 2001)
 Will & Grace (episode: "Fagel Attraction",  2002)
 Maybe It's Me (1 episode, 2002)
 Roswell (1 episode, 2002)
 Son of the Beach (1 episode, 2002)
 American Dreams (1 episode, 2002)
 The Guardian (1 episode, 2003)
 She Spies (1 episode, 2004)
 The Drew Carey Show (1 episode, 2004)
 Wedding Daze (2004)
 Strong Medicine (1 episode, 2004)
 Crossing Jordan (1 episode, 2006)   
 Hallmark movies & mysteries/ Mystery Woman:Wild West (1 episode, 2006)
 Rodney (1 episode, 2006)
 Pandemic (2007)
 Final Approach (2007)
 Mad Men (1 episode, 2007)
 Eli Stone (1 episode, 2008)
 The New Adventures of Old Christine (1 episode, 2008)
 Two and a Half Men (1 episode, 2008)
 Everybody Hates Chris (1 episode, 2009)
 Monk (1 episode, 2009)
 NCIS (1 episode, 2009)
 CSI: Miami (1 episode, 2012)
 It's Always Sunny in Philadelphia (1 episode, 2012)
 Anger Management (3 episodes, 2014)
 The Middle (1 episode, 2017)
 Angie Tribeca (1 episode, 2017)
 The Orville (1 episode, 2017)
 Bosch (3 episodes, 2018)
 Bosch: Legacy (1 episode, 2022)

References

External links
 Profile, usatoday.com; October 22, 2012.
 

1953 births
American male child actors
American male film actors
American male television actors
Living people
Male actors from Los Angeles
Male actors from Hollywood, Los Angeles
Writers from Los Angeles
21st-century American male actors
20th-century American male actors